Vaimalau is a village in Wallis and Futuna. It is located in Mua District on the southern-central part of Wallis Island. Its population according to the 2018 census was 371 people.

References

Populated places in Wallis and Futuna